The renminbi (RMB, also known as Chinese yuan; ISO code: CNY) is the official currency of the People's Republic of China. Although it is not a freely convertible currency, and has an official exchange rate, the CNY plays an important role in the world economy and international trade. This page lists past and present CNY exchange rates with other major currencies, in both nominal and purchasing power parity (PPP) terms.

Background
After taking control of economic policy in 1978, Deng Xiaoping opened up China to foreign trade and investment, permitting a large influx of foreign capital and sparking rapid economic growth. In 2010, China's annual level of inward foreign direct investment (FDI) reached a record US$106 billion. As of 2013, China is the world's second-largest economy, with an estimated nominal gross domestic product (GDP) of US$8.25 trillion and a total international trade value of US$3.64 trillion. Since the mid-1990s, the official CNY exchange rate has been adopted by numerous international financial and governmental organizations, such as the International Monetary Fund (IMF), the World Bank and the United Nations (UN). The perceived undervaluing of the CNY by the Chinese government has led to tensions between China and other major economies. In August 2019, US President Donald Trump designated China a currency manipulator, a designation not supported by the IMF.

Nominal exchange rates

List of nominal exchange rates

List of World Bank nominal exchange rates

List of IMF nominal exchange rates

List of purchasing power parity exchange rates
Purchasing power parity (PPP) figures vary based on inflation and the revision of census figures in different periods. The following is a list of CNY exchange rates based on PPP, estimated according to the International Monetary Fund's World Economic Outloo wek (WEO) database from 2006–present. The exchange rate shown is Intl$. 1 to Chinese yuan (CNY).

References

External links 
China State Administration of Foreign Exchange

Renminbi
Renminbi
People's Bank of China
Foreign trade of China